Heteroturris serta is a species of sea snail, a marine gastropod mollusk in the family Borsoniidae.

Description
The length of the shell attains 9.3 mm.

Distribution
This marine species occurs off Eastern Indonesia

References

 Sysoev, Alexander. Mollusca Gastropoda: new deep-water turrid gastropods (Conoidea) from eastern Indonesia. Muséum national d'Histoire naturelle, 1997.

External links
 Biolib.cz: Heteroturris serta
  Bouchet P., Kantor Yu.I., Sysoev A. & Puillandre N. (2011) A new operational classification of the Conoidea. Journal of Molluscan Studies 77: 273–308
 
 >MNHN, Paris: Heteroturris serta (holotype)

serta
Gastropods described in 1997